Blue Lake Fine Arts Camp is a Michigan nonprofit organization located in the Manistee National Forest that provides summer fine arts camp and international exchange programs in music, art, dance, and drama.

The Blue Lake Fine Arts Camp was founded as a non-profit organization in 1966 by the Stansell family, who remain the multi-generational proprietors of the institution. The camp is located on approximately 1200 acres in the Manistee National Forest in Michigan. It can host 4500  5th through 12th grade students across several 12-day sessions each summer. It operates FM radio stations locally and in Grand Rapids that are National Public Radio affiliates.

For Central campers, several options for fine arts are offered, including theater, band, choir, art, dance, and many others. Campers may also choose from many options for minors, such as conducting or team sports. In addition to the Central camp, there is the more relaxed Bernstein camp for younger students in grades 5th through 8th. Bernstein campers may choose between orchestra and band for their concentration.

Blue Lake also offers adult camp programs. Like the youth programs, adult campers take part in daily instruction on their instrument as well as ensemble rehearsals. Access to the camp's recreational, elective instructional, and regular concert programs is available to all ages as well. Adult musicians may either stay on Blue Lake property in campers or tents in the Niblock camp ground, or find accommodation at local hotels.

International exchange

Blue Lake hosts international exchange students in the arts as well as organizing several ensembles of American students to travel to Europe and perform each year. These ensembles include, but are not limited to, concert band, jazz band, orchestra, and choir. These exchanges serve to expose students to other cultures and have been cited as “outstanding representatives of the United States”. The camp has also initiated such experiments in multi-cultural cooperation as the Blue Lake in Bavaria concert band which was formed out of a mixture of American and European junior and senior high school students to rehearse and perform together over the course of a month.

Leonard Falcone

Prior to the founding of Blue Lake, Leonard Falcone, baritone virtuoso and Director of Bands at Michigan State University, had conducted many Youth Music at Michigan State summer camps in conjunction with, and support of, the Michigan School Band and Orchestra Association. At the urging of Fritz Stansell, Falcone shifted his focus to aiding the program at Blue Lake and became a regular staff member/artist in residence. Falcone would be joined later by other notables of the music education and concert band world, such as composers John Barnes Chance and Václav Nelhýbel.

Following Falcone's death in 1985, Blue Lake became home to the new Leonard Falcone International Tuba and Euphonium Festival and competition created by his students in his memory and held at Blue Lake every year.

See also
Leonard Falcone International Tuba and Euphonium Festival

Solid Brass: The Leonard Falcone Story by Rita Griffin Comstock

References

Summer schools
Summer camps in Michigan
Art schools in Michigan
Music education organizations
Education in Muskegon County, Michigan
Buildings and structures in Muskegon County, Michigan
1966 establishments in Michigan
Music festivals established in 1966